Allyl halides are organic halides containing an allyl group.

Allyl halides include:
 Allyl chloride
 Allyl bromide
 Allyl iodide

See also